District 187: Sin Streets was a first-person shooter video game developed by Netmarble, a subsidiary of CJ Corporation. An online multiplayer, the game pits SWAT teams and gangsters against each other in urban combat. The game was released on November 20, 2012, with digital distribution through Steam made available on November 28.

Gameplay 
The game resembles Counter-Strike, including its "cops and robbers" setup, game modes and map layouts. It features an extensive weapon modification system that allows both mechanic and cosmetic upgrades. The game focuses on clans and team-based progression. Clans will compete for territory, with clan performance in four weekly "street fight" events determining possession of city districts.

Business model 
District 187 is free-to-play, with all weapons available for in-game currency only. Players are charged real money for cosmetic modifications and for upgrades that speed up the acquisition of in-game currency.

Development 
The game was developed for western audiences by CJ Corporation's North American subsidiary. On October 3, 2013, the developers shut down the game servers and took the game offline. It is now no longer available.

Turkish version 
This game was adapted for the Turkish country and will exist until 2015 under another name: S2 Son Silah.

References

External links 
 Official website
 Official blog

2012 video games
First-person shooter multiplayer online games
Free-to-play video games
Multiplayer video games
Organized crime video games
Video games about police officers
Video games developed in South Korea
Windows games
Windows-only games
Netmarble games